Adolfo Gutierrez Quiñones or Adolfo Gordon Quiñones (sources differ) (May 11, 1955 – December 29, 2020), known professionally as Shabba Doo, was an American actor, break dancer, and choreographer of African American and Puerto Rican descent.

Quiñones was a founding member of The Lockers, who were responsible for popularizing the locking style of street dance, and played Orlando "Ozone" in the 1984 breakdancing hit film Breakin' and its sequel, Breakin' 2: Electric Boogaloo.

Early life and education
Quiñones was born and raised in Chicago, Illinois, United States; His father, Adolfo, had been born in Puerto Rico and became a salesman and a laborer. His mother, Ruth (McDaniel) Quiñones, was an accountant whose family had moved from Mississippi to Chicago during the Great Migration.  His mother raised him as a single parent from the age of three. He had a younger sister, Fawn Quiñones, who was also a dancer, and frequently featured on the musical variety television program Soul Train. Quiñones was raised in the Cabrini–Green housing complex in the city's North Side. For high school, Quiñones attended Cooley Vocational High School and Robert A. Waller High School (now known as Lincoln Park High School). In the 1970s, his family moved to the Los Angeles area. He began dancing in clubs around Crenshaw Boulevard and at venues like Radiotron, near MacArthur Park. Break-dance culture was growing at these establishments, and he dueled nightly in them with rivals on the dance floor. He started calling himself Sir Lance-a-Lock, which then became Shabba-Dabba-Do-Bop, which was finally shortened to Shabba-Doo.

Career
As a member of The Original Lockers along with Don "Campbellock" Campbell, Fred "Rerun" Berry and Toni Basil, Quiñones became one of the innovators of the dance style commonly known as locking. His best-known role was as Ozone in the 1984 hit cult film Breakin' and its sequel, Breakin' 2: Electric Boogaloo. Quiñones also appeared in Rave - Dancing to a Different Beat, which he also directed. He made guest appearances on TV shows including The Super Mario Bros. Super Show!, Married... with Children, Miami Vice, What's Happening!!, Saturday Night Live and Lawrence Leung's Choose Your Own Adventure. Quiñones was writing A Breakin’ Uprising. Besides acting and dancing work in film and television, Quiñones has served as a choreographer to many singers, such as Lionel Richie, Madonna, and Luther Vandross. He was a primary dancer and main choreographer for Madonna's Who's That Girl? Tour in 1987. He served as choreographer for Jamie Kennedy's MTV sitcom, Blowin' Up. He choreographed Three Six Mafia's performance on the 78th Academy Awards; the group won the Oscar for best original song for their song "It's Hard out Here for a Pimp". He appeared in the music video for Lionel Richie's "All Night Long" and was featured in the music video for Chaka Khan's 1984 song "I Feel for You".

Personal life and death
Quiñones was married twice and had two children. His first marriage was to Gwendolyn Powell from 1976 until 1982. After divorcing Powell, Quiñones married actress Lela Rochon in 1982. Quiñones and Rochon were married until 1987. He died at his home from undisclosed causes on December 29, 2020, at age 65. A later coroner's report listed the cause of death as arteriosclerotic cardiovascular disease.

Filmography

See also
 List of dancers

References

External links
 
 Interview with Shabba-Doo at Ham Radio Nation
 Interview at Blogtalkradio
 Shabba-Doo performing in the 1970s to 1980s on YouTube

1955 births
2020 deaths
American choreographers
American male dancers
American dancers
American male film actors
American male television actors
American people of Puerto Rican descent
American people of Ethiopian descent
Male actors from Chicago
Puerto Rican dancers
Dancers from Illinois
African-American dancers
People of Afro–Puerto Rican descent
20th-century African-American people
21st-century African-American people
American breakdancers